Korie Homan and Esther Vergeer defeated Beth Arnoult and Jan Proctor in the final, 6–3, 6–1 to win the inaugural women's doubles wheelchair tennis title at the 2005 US Open.

Draw

Finals

References
 Draw

Women's Wheelchair Doubles
U.S. Open, 2005 Women's Doubles